Big John Steak & Onion, aka BJs & Onion or Steak and Onion and formerly Slick-Chick, Inc., is a regional sub sandwich chain.  The name came from a nickname that the founder, John E. Klobucar, had received from his friends.  The chain is considered a restaurant icon of the Flint Area.

History
John E. Klobucar opened Flint, Michigan's first Kentucky Fried Chicken in 1963, the first outside of the Detroit area. He incorporated his business on August 16, 1967 as Slick-Chick, Inc. A decade later in 1973, Klobucar started Big John Steak and Onion, the first restaurant to serve submarine sandwiches in the Flint Area. The first location was opened on Dort Highway, near Court Street, and is still operating there. The original menu was the Steak and Onion plus 2 other subs and a Koegel hot dog. His brother Joseph "Joe" Klobucher opened Big John Chicken & Sandwich Factory franchise where he lived in Caro in 1973. On September 16, 1975, Slick-Chick changed its name to Big John Steak & Onion, Inc. Klobucar later opened a KFC in Owosso, but sold the Flint location. 

The restaurant grew into a chain of 15 stores across Mid-Michigan by May 2011, when Klobucar died. Then Joe Klobucar took over as Chairman/President/CEO.

Menu
steak and onion sandwich, for which it is best known for
Red Sauce, a cocktail sauce with a sweet/hot taste, its recipe is credited to John Kish, owner of Uncle Bob's Diner, a well known former Downtown Flint restaurant.

References

External links
  Big Johns Steak & Onion.net

Fast-food chains of the United States
Regional restaurant chains in the United States
Restaurants in Michigan
Submarine sandwich restaurants
Restaurants established in 1973
1973 establishments in Michigan
Companies based in Flint, Michigan